Pelican Lake 191B is an Indian reserve of the Pelican Lake First Nation in Saskatchewan. It is 14 kilometres west of Leoville. In the 2016 Canadian Census, it recorded a population of 50 living in 11 of its 19 total private dwellings.

References

Pelican Lake First Nation
Indian reserves in Saskatchewan
Division No. 16, Saskatchewan